Fort Dorchester High School is a public high school located in North Charleston, South Carolina, United States. It is one of the three high schools in Dorchester School District Two.

Athletics

Fort Dorchester High School's mascot is the Patriot, and its colors are red, blue, and silver.

Fort Dorchester competes as a 5A school in Region 8.

In 2015, the Fort Dorchester football team won the 5A South Carolina State Championship.

Notable alumni 
 Jasmine Camacho-Quinn, Olympic gold medalist in 100 meter hurdles at 2020 Summer Olympics
 Carlos Dunlap, NFL defensive end, 2-time Pro Bowl selection
 Karl Jacobs, Twitch streamer and YouTuber
 Byron Maxwell, NFL cornerback, Super Bowl XLVIII champion with the Seattle Seahawks
 Robert Quinn, NFL defensive end, 3-time Pro Bowl selection
 John Simpson, NFL offensive guard

References

External links

 Official webpage

Public high schools in South Carolina
International Baccalaureate schools in South Carolina
Schools in Dorchester County, South Carolina
1992 establishments in South Carolina
Educational institutions established in 1992